Agnes Escapes from the Nursing Home is a 16mm,  hand-painted, experimental animated film by Eileen O'Meara. It was jury-selected for Sundance Film Festival, London Film Festival, Chicago International Film Festival, and aired on Showtime Cable Network, The Movie Channel, and PBS.

Reviews 
"Threaded through this program are four short films, of which the most remarkable (is) Agnes Escapes From the Nursing Home, a cel-animation by the extremely gifted Eileen O'Meara, whose colors and images are delicate and mysterious..."
Sheila Benson, Los Angeles Times

"The poetic reflections of a disturbed mind: remarkable animation."
John Gillett, The London Film Festival

"A hauntingly beautiful film."
Beverly Freeman, Coe Films

Synopsis 
“The message of this (film) depends solely on the viewer's interpretation of how Agnes escapes from the nursing home. The reviewer envisions Agnes escaping through death, thereby experiencing freedom from a life of many choices...”
Dolly Partridge, Media Review 

"A bittersweet animation that looks deeply into the thoughts of Agnes, taking us on one of her daily journeys."
Sundance Film Festival, Sundance Institute

Festivals and screenings 
Sundance Film Festival
The London FIlm Festival
Chicago International Film Festival
Krakow Film Festival
Rendezvous With Madness
Women in the Director's Chair Film and Video Festival

References 
 Los Angeles Times, Agnes Escapes from the Nursing Home
 New York Times, Agnes Escapes from the Nursing Home
 Sundance Film Festival Database, Agnes Escapes from the Nursing Home

External links 
 Agnes Escapes from the Nursing Home Information Page
 Great Women Animators: Eileen O'Meara
Eileen O'Meara's website
 Turner Classic Movies, Agnes Escapes from the Nursing Home

See also 
Eileen O'Meara
UNICEF Cartoons for Children's Rights
That Strange Person
Panic Attack!

1988 films
American animated short films
1980s animated short films
Films about death
Films about old age
American independent films
1980s American films